Common wood sorrel is a common name for two plants species in the genus Oxalis. Common wood sorrel may refer to:

 Oxalis acetosella, native to Europe and Asia
 Oxalis montana, native to eastern North America
 Oxalis stricta